Waterloo was an electoral district of the Legislative Assembly in the Australian state of New South Wales, named after and including the Sydney suburb of Waterloo. It was created in 1894, when multi-member districts were abolished, and partly replaced the former 4 member electoral district of Redfern,  In 1904 it was abolished and partly replaced by Alexandria.

Members for Waterloo

Election results

References

Former electoral districts of New South Wales
Constituencies established in 1894
1894 establishments in Australia
Constituencies disestablished in 1904
1904 disestablishments in Australia